Chillai Kalan or Chilla-i-Kalan (Translation : forty days of intense cold) is the local name given to 40 day period of harsh winter in  Kashmir. It is the coldest part of winter, starting from 21 December to January 29 every year. Chillai-Kalan is followed by 20-day long Chillai Khurd (Translation : small cold) that occurs between January 30 and February 18 and a 10-days long Chillai Bachha (Translation : baby cold) which is from February 19 to February 28.

Weather
During this 40 day period in Kashmir, nights are chilly and day temperatures thrive in single digits. During Chillai-Kalan, the weather in valley of Kashmir continues to remain cold with minimum temperatures hovering below the freezing point. The snow that falls during this time period  freezes and lasts longer. It is this snow that adds to the  glaciers of the Valley and replenishes the perennial reservoirs that feed the rivers, streams and lakes in Kashmir during the months of summer. Any snowfall after the chillai kalan does not last long.

Etymology
Chillai Kalan is a Persian word which means Major Cold.

Impact
Chillai Kalan affects the daily life of Kashmiris. Use of Pheran (Kashmiri dress) and a traditional firing pot called Kanger increases. Due to subzero temperatures, tap water pipelines freeze partially during this period and the Dal Lake also freezes. Tourist resorts like Sonamarg and Gulmarg receive heavy snow.

Cultural importance
 Celebrating Chillai Kalan with sumptuous Harisa (Kashmiri) is a quintessential part of Kashmiri tradition.
 The first day of ‘Chillai kalan’ is to be celebrated as ‘World Pheran Day'.

See also
 Rantas
 Phiran
 Kanger

References

Culture of Jammu and Kashmir
Kashmiri culture
Cold waves in Asia